Champaign is a city in Champaign County, Illinois, United States. The population was 88,302 at the 2020 census. It is the tenth-most populous municipality in Illinois and the fourth most populous city in Illinois outside the Chicago metropolitan area. It is included in the Champaign–Urbana metropolitan area.

Champaign shares the main campus of the University of Illinois with its twin city of Urbana. Champaign is also home to Parkland College, which serves about 18,000 students during the academic year. Due to the university and a number of well-known technology startup companies, it is often referred to as the hub, or a significant landmark, of the Silicon Prairie. Champaign houses offices for the Fortune 500 companies Abbott, Archer Daniels Midland (ADM), Caterpillar, John Deere, Dow Chemical Company, IBM, and State Farm. Champaign also serves as the headquarters for several companies, the most notable being Jimmy John's.

History

Champaign was founded in 1855, when the Illinois Central Railroad laid its rail track two miles (3 km) west of downtown Urbana. Originally called "West Urbana", it was renamed Champaign when it acquired a city charter in 1860. Both the city and county name were derived from Champaign County, Ohio.

During February 1969, Carl Perkins joined with Bob Dylan to write the song "Champaign, Illinois", which Perkins released on his album On Top. The band Old 97's took another Bob Dylan song, "Desolation Row", and combined its melody with new lyrics to make a new song "Champaign, Illinois", which they released with Dylan's blessing on their 2010 album The Grand Theatre Volume One. It achieved considerable popularity. The two "Champaign, Illinois" songs are not similar to each other, except that Bob Dylan was involved in both of them.

On September 22, 1985, Champaign hosted the first Farm Aid concert at the University of Illinois' Memorial Stadium. The concert drew a crowd of 80,000 people and raised over $7 million for American family farmers.

In 2005, Champaign-Urbana (specifically the University of Illinois) was the location of the National Science Olympiad Tournament, attracting young scientists from all 50 states. The city also hosts the state Science Olympiad competition every year. The University of Illinois Urbana-Champaign once again hosted the National competition on May 20–22, 2010.

Joan Severns was the city's first female Mayor, serving between 1979 and 1983. Deb Frank Feinen, who has served as Mayor since 2015, is the city's second female Mayor. In May 2017, the city's first female-majority city council was sworn in.

Geography

Location

Champaign is a city in central Illinois and is located on relatively high ground, providing sources to the Kaskaskia River to the west, and the Embarras River to the south.  Downtown Champaign drains into Boneyard Creek, which feeds the Saline Branch of the Salt Fork Vermilion River.

Champaign shares a border with the neighboring city of Urbana; together they are home to the University of Illinois. Champaign, Urbana, and the bordering village of Savoy form the Champaign-Urbana Metropolitan Area also known as Champaign-Urbana. It may also be colloquially known as the "Twin Cities" or Chambana.

Climate
The city has a humid continental climate, typical of the Midwestern United States, with hot summers and cold, moderately snowy winters. Temperatures exceed 90 °F (32.2 °C) on an average of 24 days per year, and typically fall below 0 °F (−17.8 °C) on six nights annually. The record high temperature in Champaign was 109 °F (42.8 °C) in 1954, and the record low was −25 °F (−31.7 °C), recorded on four separate occasions − in 1899, 1905, 1994 and 1999.

Demographics

As of the 2020 census there were 88,302 people, 34,851 households, and 15,624 families residing in the city. The racial makeup of the city was 53.45% White, 17.97% African American, 0.37% Native American, 16.69% Asian, 0.05% Pacific Islander, 3.96% from other races, and 7.52% from two or more races. Hispanic or Latino of any race were 8.74% of the population.

There were 34,851 households, out of which 40.07% had children under the age of 18 living with them, 32.63% were married couples living together, 8.77% had a female householder with no husband present, and 55.17% were non-families. 39.97% of all households were made up of individuals, and 7.01% had someone living alone who was 65 years of age or older. The average household size was 3.13 and the average family size was 2.30.

The city's age distribution consisted of 17.0% under the age of 18, 29.0% from 18 to 24, 25.8% from 25 to 44, 17.7% from 45 to 64, and 10.5% who were 65 years of age or older. The median age was 27.3 years. For every 100 females, there were 110.0 males. For every 100 females age 18 and over, there were 107.1 males.

The median income for a household in the city was $49,467, and the median income for a family was $78,118. Males had a median income of $36,680 versus $27,805 for females. The per capita income for the city was $30,245. About 10.3% of families and 23.9% of the population were below the poverty line, including 17.3% of those under age 18 and 9.4% of those age 65 or over.

Economy
In addition to the University of Illinois, Champaign is also home to Parkland College. Herff Jones, formerly Collegiate Cap and Gown, and Kraft also form part of the city's industrial base. Kraft's plant is one of the largest pasta factories in North America.

Champaign is also home to nationally recognized record labels, artist management companies, booking agencies and recording studios. Polyvinyl Records, Undertow Music, Parasol Records, Great Western Record Recorders, Pogo Studios, and Nicodemus Booking Agency are all based in Champaign.

In April 2011, The Christian Science Monitor named Champaign-Urbana one of the five cities leading the economic turnaround based on jobs; the information sector added over 300 jobs within a year and unemployment dropped 2.1%.

Research Park

The city also features a large technology and software industry mostly focusing on research and development of new technologies. The Research Park, located on campus land just south of the State Farm Center and run by the University of Illinois, is home to many companies, including Caterpillar, ADM, John Deere, AbbVie, Motorola Solutions, Brunswick, Capital One, Cargill, NVIDIA, Riverbed Technology, Abbott Laboratories, Yahoo! and the State Farm Research and Development Center.  The technology incubator at Research Park, EnterpriseWorks, has launched 350+ startups since opening in 2014. Famous graduates of EnterpriseWorks include Agrible, which was sold to Nutrien in 2018 for $63 million.  Another success story is Starfire, which graduated from EnterpriseWorks and moved into other space at the Research Park. In 2022, Starfire was growing so fast, it bought its own 190,000 SF building in the northwest side of Champaign.

Top employers

According to the Champaign County Economic Development Corporation, the top ten employers in the city are:

Other major employers include Horizon Hobby, Jimmy John's, Plastipak, SuperValu, and Wolfram Research.

Numerous other software and technology companies also have offices in Champaign including Ansys, Amdocs, Cloudflare, Instarecon, Phonak, Power World, Caterpillar Simulation Center, and Volition. The largest high technology employer is Wolfram Research, with more than 400 employees in Champaign. The United States Army Corps of Engineers maintains the Construction Engineering Research Laboratory (CERL) in Champaign.

Startups
The Champaign-Urbana community is a well-known hub for startups, including a top ranking from Silicon Prairie News in 2019.

Arts and culture

Landmarks and districts

Downtown
In the 1980s, part of the downtown Champaign area (Neil St.) was closed to vehicular traffic to create a pedestrian mall, but this short-lived experiment was scrapped when business declined.  As part of a revitalization effort, One Main Development constructed two new mixed-use buildings: One Main and M2 on Neil. The City of Champaign gave $3.7 million in tax incentives for the building of M2 and agreed to pay nearly $11 million for a new parking deck.

This growth in downtown Champaign coincided with the larger growth of the "north Prospect" shopping district on the city's northern boundary. The growth in the north Prospect area relied, in part, on leapfrogging, moving out to the countryside and developing more remote farm land that eventually connects to the main development. Given the overwhelming success of such suburban shopping areas nationally, new development within any city center represented an alternative to the dominant movement out and away from the cities.

In April 2007, One Main Development broke ground on M2 on Neil, a nine-story, $40 million, mixed-use project – the largest ever for downtown Champaign – located at the corner of Neil and Church Street. M2 on Neil features retail and office space, and 50 upscale condominiums.

The project was expected to be complete in late 2008, but experienced delays in construction, partially due to $5 Million in mechanics liens filed against One Main Development,  as well as a large fire on an adjacent property that caused substantial facade damage to M2. Construction on the commercial shell and core and the residences was completed in the Summer of 2009. New condo owners began moving into M2 in April 2009 and the first ground-floor tenant, a branch of local BankChampaign, opened its doors in November 2009. Destihl, a restaurant and brewpub, opened in Spring 2011, and two other restaurants opened in ground-floor space in Fall 2011.

The City of Champaign has constructed a six-story parking structure on Hill Street adjacent to M2, intended to serve the greater Downtown; it was completed in May 2009.

The Champaign City Building serves as the City Hall and is a recognizable landmark. The building replaces the original city building, which sat on the same site until 1937.

Art Theater Co-op

The Art Theater Co-op, which showed independent and foreign films, was built in 1913 as the Park Theatre. From 1969 to 1986, it showed adult films.  Until October 2019, it was the only single-screen movie theater operating daily in Champaign-Urbana, and was the United States's first co-operatively owned art movie theater. It closed in October 2019.

Virginia Theatre
The historic Virginia Theatre is a recently restored 1463-seat movie theater, which opened on December 28, 1921. It has an ornate, Spanish Renaissance-influenced interior, full stage and dressing rooms, and its original Wurlitzer pipe organ. It hosts Ebertfest and has a single 56' x 23' screen. The theater does not have a daily show schedule, but schedules special screenings and live performances several times each month.

Campustown

Located along Green Street, this commercial district serves as the entertainment and retail center for students at the University of Illinois and citizens of the Champaign-Urbana Metropolitan Area. This area has been undergoing change since 2002 with the completion of a new $7 million streetscape project. Campustown is now attracting new retail and entertainment stores as well as serving as the center for new construction projects. Several new projects opened in 2008 including the 18-story Burnham 310 high-rise and grocery store at 4th and Springfield, and a new 24-story apartment building called 309 Green.

The newly renamed Tower at 3rd (formerly Champaign Hilton, Century 21, Quality Inn, University Inn, Presidential Tower) is located in the University District and is over twenty stories high. A hotel until 2001, it currently houses student apartments.

A new 14-story apartment complex was completed in 2014 at the intersection of 6th and Green streets (site of the former Gameday Spirit). A 12-story, mixed-use complex consisting of a hotel, apartments and parking was scheduled to be completed by August 2015. The mixed-use complex is reported to consist of two towers which will be connected by a skywalk. A 27-story apartment building is planned at 308 East Green Street. This high-rise is reported to have an automated parking vault which will be operated by an elevator.

Museums and libraries
 Orpheum Children's Science Museum. A hands on science museum for children. It closed in 2020.
 Krannert Art Museum. An Art Museum featuring both modern and classical art owned by the University of Illinois Urbana-Champaign. It has  of space devoted to all periods of art, from ancient Egyptian to contemporary photography.
 Champaign County Historical Museum.  Located in the Historic Cattle Bank built in 1858. Features exhibits on the history of the area and the midwest as a whole.
 Champaign Public Library
 Urbana Free Library

Sports

Illinois Fighting Illini
The University of Illinois Urbana-Champaign fields ten men and eleven women varsity sports.

Minor League Baseball
During its history, the city has been home to several separate minor league baseball clubs. The first in 1889 was a shared club between Champaign and Logansport, Indiana, called the Logansport/Champaign-Urbana Clippers. The Clippers played for one season in the Illinois–Indiana League before folding.

The city hosted its second team, the Champaign-Urbana Velvets from 1911 to 1914 who played in the Illinois–Missouri League until the league disbanded after 1914.

The city's most recent minor league team was the Champaign-Urbana Bandits who played during the single 1994 season of the Great Central League. The Bandits played at Illinois Field. Prior to holding postseason play, the league folded.

Twice Champaign was also home to a Collegiate Summer Baseball League team. The city's Champaign County Colts were a founding member of the Central Illinois Collegiate League from 1963 to 1964. In 1990 the Colts were revived as the Champaign-Urbana Colts until the team folded in 1996. The more recent club played its home games at Illinois Field.

Minor League Basketball
In October 2014, the Midwest Professional Basketball Association announced the creation of the Champaign Swarm as one of its founding members, that began play at the Dodds Athletic Center in January 2015.

Stadiums

Memorial Stadium

Built from 1922 to 1923, Memorial Stadium was named in honor of the students and faculty members who died overseas during World War I. Since opening in 1923, Memorial Stadium has been home to Illinois Fighting Illini football.  The stadium also was the temporary home of the NFL's Chicago Bears for the 2002 season while its regular venue Soldier Field was being renovated.

State Farm Center
Originally known as the Assembly Hall, the State Farm Center is home to the Illinois Fighting Illini men's basketball and Illinois Fighting Illini women's basketball teams.  It holds the annual Broadway Series, which features popular musicals.

Parks and recreation

Education

K-12 education
The city of Champaign is served by Champaign Unit 4 School District. Unit 4 administers both Champaign Central High School and Champaign Centennial High School.

Champaign is also served by three private high schools. The largest of the three is a Roman Catholic High school, St. Thomas More High School which is located on the city's far northwest side. The school opened in 2000 and is the newest charter of the Roman Catholic Diocese of Peoria.

The second is Judah Christian School, which is located just south of I-74 on Prospect Avenue. Judah Christian opened in 1983 and serves about 120 9th- 12th grade students. The entire school's pre-K through 12th grade enrollment is a little more than 500 students.

The third is Academy High, which is an accredited, Independent high school located in South Champaign on Fox Drive.  Academy High opened in 1997 and serves 60 9th - 12th grade students. The school is designed to be student-centered, highly collaborative, and project-based.

Higher education
Located within Champaign are two institutions of higher education, the University of Illinois Urbana-Champaign and Parkland College.

Media

FM radio

AM radio
 580 WILL, Public Radio
 1400 WDWS, News/Talk (AM Stereo)
 1460 WKJR, Spanish Music

NOAA Weather Radio
NOAA Weather Radio station WXJ76 transmits from Champaign and is licensed to NOAA's National Weather Service Central Illinois Weather Forecast Office at Lincoln, broadcasting on a frequency of 162.550 MHz (channel 7 on most newer weather radios, and most SAME weather radios). The station activates the SAME tone alarm feature and a 1050 Hz tone activating older radios (except for AMBER Alerts, using the SAME feature only) for hazardous weather and non-weather warnings and emergencies, along with selected weather watches, for the Illinois counties of Champaign, Coles, DeWitt, Douglas, Edgar, Ford, Moultrie, Piatt, and Vermillion. Weather permitting, a tone alarm test of both the SAME and 1050 Hz tone features are conducted every Wednesday between 11 AM and Noon.

Television
 3 WCIA, CBS
 7 W07DD-D, Three Angels Broadcasting Network
 12 WILL-TV, PBS
 15 WICD "NewsChannel 15", ABC
 17 WAND, NBC
 23 WBUI, CW
 27 WCCU "Fox 55/27"
 33 W31EH-D, Trinity Broadcasting Network
 44 WBXC-CA, MTV 2
 49 WCIX "My WCFN TV" My Network TV
 51 WEIU, PBS

Print and electronic media
 The News-Gazette, daily local newspaper
 Daily Illini, campus newspaper
 The Booze News, former satirical campus newspaper, now called The Black Sheep
 Buzz Weekly, weekly entertainment magazine
 Prospectus News, Parkland College's independent student newspaper

Infrastructure

Transportation
Champaign is served by I-57, I-72, I-74, two railroad lines, and the University of Illinois operated Willard Airport (CMI).

Interstate 57 enters in Champaign County after a diamond interchange with Curtis Road. It makes 2 Cloverleaf interchanges with Interstate 72 towards Decatur, Illinois, and the second (soon to be changed) Cloverleaf interchange with Interstate 74 in Illinois to Indianapolis. After making the two major interchanges, it runs out of Champaign County with a Partial cloverleaf interchange with U.S. Route 45 to Rantoul, Illinois. Interstate 74 starts with U.S. Route 150 in Illinois with Mahomet, Illinois, it makes two total interchanges within the city's limits. After making those interchanges, it makes one interchange with Interstate 57. After making the main interchange it starts to make interchanges with the city's streets. Interstate 74 goes out of Champaign County with St. Joseph, Illinois. Interstate 72 enters Champaign County with an interchange towards Monticello and north towards Mahomet after the main route that heads north crosses Interstate 74. Interstate 72 then heads into the cloverleaf interchange with Interstate 57 and then continues east for 1 1/2 to 2 miles eventually terminating itself at University Avenue on the southeast side of Champaign.

Highways

Interstate Highways
 Interstate 57
 Interstate 72
 Interstate 74

US Highways
 US 45
 US 150

Illinois Highways
 Route 10

Airport
Champaign is served by Willard Airport (CMI) which is operated by the University of Illinois Urbana-Champaign. The airport is currently served by American Eagle offering daily flights to Chicago O'Hare International Airport and Dallas/Fort Worth International Airport.

Housed at the Willard Airport was the University of Illinois Institute of Aviation, which was forced to close for the 2013–2014 academic year due to university budget cuts after 60 years of operation.

Mass transit

The local bus system, which is supported by the taxpayers of the Champaign–Urbana Mass Transit District (MTD) and the University of Illinois, serves Champaign, Urbana, Savoy, and surrounding areas.  The C-U MTD has twice been named as the best local transit  system in the United States.

Illinois Terminal
In 1999, a newly designed intermodal transportation center, aptly named Illinois Terminal by historic reference to the defunct electric interurban rail line that once ran through Champaign, was completed and serves as a central facility for intercity passenger rail, bus services as well as the MTD's local bus network.

Rail
Amtrak provides service to Champaign-Urbana by: Train 58/59, the City of New Orleans; Train 390/391, the Saluki; and Train 392/393, the Illini.

The former Illinois Central Railroad line—now part of the Canadian National system—runs north to south through the city. A spur line from the Canadian National line provides service to several large industries, including two large food processing plants, on the west edge of Champaign and two grain elevators in outlying communities to the west. The Norfolk Southern operates an east to west line through Champaign. The NS line connects industries in eastern Urbana to the Norfolk Southern main line at Mansfield, Illinois, west of Champaign. The line now operated by Norfolk Southern is the former Peoria & Eastern Railway, later operated as part of the Big Four (Cleveland, Cincinnati, Chicago and St. Louis Railway), New York Central, Penn Central, and Conrail systems, being sold by Conrail to Norfolk Southern in 1996. Construction of the line was begun by the Danville, Urbana, Bloomington and Pekin Railroad. This short-lived entity became part of the Indianapolis, Bloomington and Western Railway before the railroad was completed.

Bus
Greyhound Lines, Peoria Charter Coach Company, and Burlington Trailways provide intercity bus service to Champaign.

Notable people

See also

Champaign–Urbana metropolitan area
Triaxial Earthquake and Shock Simulator, experimental device located in Champaign.

References

External links

 City of Champaign Web Site
 
 Early History of Champaign

 
1855 establishments in Illinois
Cities in Illinois
Cities in Champaign County, Illinois
Populated places established in 1855